Eoin Cody (born 12 September 2000) is a hurler who plays for Kilkenny Senior Championship club Ballyhale Shamrocks and at inter-county level with the Kilkenny senior hurling team. He usually lines out as a centre-forward.

Playing career

St. Kieran's College

Cody first came to hurling prominence as a student at St. Kieran's College in Kilkenny. After lining out in different grades throughout the years, he eventually joined the college's senior team. In his first big game at college's level, Cody scored eight points from placed balls in a 1–14 to 1–11 defeat by Dublin North in the 2018 Leinster final. He was dropped from the starting fifteen for the subsequent All-Ireland final against Presentation College, Athenry, but collected a winners' medal after coming on as a substitute in the 5–19 to 3-16 extra-time victory.

Cody was once again eligible for the college's senior team the following year and claimed a Leinster Colleges Championship title after a 1–17 to 2–07 defeat of Coláiste Eoin. The subsequent All-Ireland final was a repeat of the previous year, with Cody scoring eight points and collecting a second successive winners' medal after the 1–15 to 1–12 win over Presentation College, Athenry.

Ballyhale Shamrocks

After an underage career that yielded minor and under-20 championship successes, Cody joined the Ballyhale Shamrocks senior team for the 2018 Kilkenny County Championship. He made his debut on 23 September 2018, scoring a goal in the 3–22 to 1-12 first-round win over St. Patrick's. Cody ended the championship by claiming his first winners' medal after scoring 1-01 from play in the 2–20 to 2–17 defeat of Bennettsbridge in the final. He later claimed his first Leinster Club Championship medal after the 2–21 to 0–11 win over Ballyboden St. Enda's in the Leinster final.  Cody was selected at left corner-forward when Ballyhale qualified for the All-Ireland final on 17 March 2019. He collected a first winners' medal following the 2–28 to 2–11 victory over St. Thomas's. Cody was one of six Ballyhale Shamrocks hurlers later chosen on the Team of the Year.

Cody won a second successive Kilkenny County Championship title after scoring 1-02 from play in the 2–21 to 1–15 win over James Stephens in the 2019 final. His undefeated championship run continued when he subsequently won a second successive Leinster CLub Championship medal after a 1–21 to 0–15 victory over St. Mullin's in the 2019 Leinster final. On 18 January 2020, Cody was again selected at left corner-forward when Ballyhale Shamrocks faced Borris-Ileigh in the 2020 All-Ireland final. He was held scoreless over the course of the game but claimed a second successive All-Ireland Club Championship medal after the 0–18 to 0–15 victory.

Kilkenny

Cody first played for Kilkenny as a 16-year-old when he was drafted onto the minor team for the 2017 Leinster Minor Championship. He claimed a Leinster Minor Championship title that season after coming on as a substitute in the 3–15 to 1–17 defeat of Dublin in the Leinster final. After being overage for the minor grade the following year, Cody was added to the Kilkenny under-20 team in 2019. He won a Leinster Under-20 Championship medal that season after scoring two points from play in the 1–17 to 0–18 win over Wexford in the final.

Performances at club level saw Cody drafted onto the Kilkenny senior team during the 2020 National League. He made his first appearance for the team when he came on as a substitute for Billy Ryan in a drawn round 4 game with Clare. Cody was later retained on Kilkenny's Leinster Championship panel, and claimed a provincial winners' medal after lining out at left corner-forward in the 2–20 to 0–24 victory over Galway in the 2020 final.

Career statistics

Club

Inter-county

Honours

St. Kieran's College
All-Ireland Colleges Senior Hurling Championship: 2018, 2019
Leinster Colleges Senior Hurling Championship: 2019

Ballyhale Shamrocks
All-Ireland Senior Club Hurling Championship: 2019, 2020
Leinster Senior Club Hurling Championship: 2018, 2019, 2021
Kilkenny Senior Hurling Championship: 2018, 2019, 2020, 2021, 2022

Kilkenny
Leinster Senior Hurling Championship: 2020, 2021
Leinster Under-20 Hurling Championship: 2019
Leinster Minor Hurling Championship: 2017

References

2000 births
Living people
Ballyhale Shamrocks hurlers
Kilkenny inter-county hurlers